San Luis High School is a high school in San Luis, Arizona, United States. It opened in 2002 and is part of the Yuma Union High School District. The school mascot is the sidewinder.

Notable alumni
 Irving Garcia, former New York Red Bulls soccer player    

Antonio Umana

Celina Martinez

References

External links 
 San Luis High School website
 Yuma Union High School District website

Public high schools in Arizona
Schools in Yuma County, Arizona
San Luis, Arizona